In mathematics, more particularly in functional analysis, differential topology, and geometric measure theory, a k-current in the sense of Georges de Rham is a functional on the space of compactly supported differential k-forms, on a smooth manifold M. Currents formally behave like Schwartz distributions on a space of differential forms, but in a geometric setting, they can represent integration over a submanifold, generalizing the Dirac delta function, or more generally even directional derivatives of delta functions (multipoles) spread out along subsets of M.

Definition
Thus a linear functional

is an m-dimensional current if it is continuous in the following sense: If a sequence  of smooth forms, all supported in the same compact set, is such that all derivatives of all their coefficients tend uniformly to 0 when  tends to infinity, then  tends to 0.

Much of the theory of distributions carries over to currents with minimal adjustments. For example, one may define the support of a current  as the complement of the biggest open set  such that
 whenever 

Homological theory
Integration over a compact rectifiable oriented submanifold M (with boundary) of dimension m defines an m-current, denoted by :

If the boundary ∂M of M is rectifiable, then it too defines a current by integration, and by virtue of Stokes' theorem one has:

This relates the exterior derivative d with the boundary operator ∂ on the homology of M.

In view of this formula we can define a boundary operator on arbitrary currents

via duality with the exterior derivative by

for all compactly supported m-forms  

Certain subclasses of currents which are closed under  can be used instead of all currents to create a homology theory, which can satisfy the Eilenberg–Steenrod axioms in certain cases. A classical example is the subclass of integral currents on Lipschitz neighborhood retracts.

Topology and norms
The space of currents is naturally endowed with the weak-* topology, which will be further simply called weak convergence. A sequence  of currents, converges to a current  if

It is possible to define several norms on subspaces of the space of all currents.  One such norm is the mass norm.  If  is an m-form, then define its comass by
 

So if  is a simple m-form, then its mass norm is the usual L∞-norm of its coefficient. The mass of a current  is then defined as

The mass of a current represents the weighted area of the generalized surface.  A current such that M(T) < ∞ is representable by integration of a regular Borel measure by a version of the Riesz representation theorem.  This is the starting point of homological integration.

An intermediate norm is Whitney's flat norm, defined by

Two currents are close in the mass norm if they coincide away from a small part. On the other hand, they are close in the flat norm if they coincide up to a small deformation.

Examples
Recall that

so that the following defines a 0-current:

In particular every signed regular measure  is a 0-current:

Let (x, y, z) be the coordinates in  Then the following defines a 2-current (one of many):

See also

Georges de Rham
Herbert Federer
Differential geometry
Varifold

Notes

References

 
 

 .
 

Differential topology
Functional analysis
Generalized functions
Generalized manifolds
Schwartz distributions